Em Cooper, is a British filmmaker and animator. She is best known for her distinctive hand-painted oil-paint animation style and as the animation director of the critically acclaimed documentary feature films Kiss The Water and Deej, and the short films The Nest and 30% Women and Politics in Sierra Leone.

Career
Born in Cambridge, England, Cooper works as an animator specialising in combining oil-painted animation with live-action film to create sequences which evoke a stream of consciousness, or portray subjective experience. In 2010, she graduated with animation Masters from the Royal College of Art. Before obtaining her Masters degree, she worked as an Editor and Associate Producer at Current TV. 

Her film Confusion of Tongues was shortlisted for the 2012 British Animation Awards (BAA). In 2012, she co-directed the documentary 30%: Women and Politics in Sierra Leone with Anna Cady. The film had its premiere at the 2013 Sundance Film Festival. The film deals with difficulties faced by Sierra Leone’s women to be fairly represented in politics. In 2013, she won the YCN Professional Award for Animation. In In 2012-13 she directed the oil-paint animation for the feature film Kiss The Water directed by Eric Steel. The film received critical acclaim by the British press as well as the critics of Time Out, The Times, The Observer, The Financial Times and The Telegraph. The film was later named one of the ten best documentaries of the year by BBC film critic Mark Kermode. In 2015, the film was screened officially on BBC television.

Cooper has had her work screened at multiple film festivals including the European Psychoanalytic Film Festival (epff) in 2007 and the International Sándor Ferenczi Conference in Budapest, 2012/2013. In 2015, she won the Gradiva Award for film at the National Association for the Advancement of Psychoanalysis. In 2018, she directed oil-paint animated TV commercials for Berghaus and Andrex with the partnership of Water Aid. In 2015 she directed the animation for the film Deej. The film was a reframed feature documentary directed by Robert Rooy and broadcast on PBS’. In 2018, she was nominated for an Emmy Award for her animation film Deej under the Outstanding Art Direction and Graphic Design category. The film Deej was screened as part of America ReFramed on PBS World in the USA on 24 October 2017  and later won the Peabody Award in the USA.

Filmography

References

External links
 
 

Living people
People from Cambridge
British film directors
British women film directors
British animators
British women animators
British animated film directors
Year of birth missing (living people)